Kill Arman is a reality/documentary TV-series about martial arts, created by Tuukka Tiensuu and Arman Alizad, and hosted by Arman Alizad. The series was first broadcast in Finland on 9 March 2008. Currently, two seasons have been filmed and the series is airing in over 100 countries worldwide.

Synopsis 

Arman Alizad is a master tailor, a fashion reporter and a party-animal, who has not done any sports in over 20 years. But in Kill Arman he has to travel to exotic locations around the world, train a different martial art in every episode, and finally fight a master of that martial art. The physical and mental challenges make Alizad question his own belief systems, and he finds whole new sides to himself.

Cast and Characters 

Along with the host, Arman Alizad, the episodes have many famous martial arts masters mentoring Alizad. These masters include for example Leung Ting, Leo Gaje, Martin Kampmann, Ray Sefo and Amin Asikainen.

Production 

Kill Arman is a co-production between Rabbit Films, Armanin Maailma and Jim. The series was created by Arman Alizad and Tuukka Tiensuu. Tiensuu is also the director of the series.

Awards and nominations 

In 2010, Kill Arman was nominated for the Best Finnish TV-show of the year in Venla-gaala.

Distribution

Kill Arman is distributed in Finland by JIM. Internationally it is distributed by DRG. It airs in several dozen TV-networks around the world, including the BBC.

References

External links 
 Kill Arman on the Finnish distributor's site.
   Kill Arman on BBC.
  An article on a Finnish newspaper about the distribution deal to 104 countries.
  Kill Arman as one of the nonimees for the best Finnish TV-show award in 2010.

Finnish television shows
2009 Finnish television series debuts
Jim (TV channel) original programming